Gentlemen Broncos is a 2009 American comedy film written by Jared and Jerusha Hess and directed by Jared Hess.

The film stars Michael Angarano, Jemaine Clement, Jennifer Coolidge, and Sam Rockwell.

Plot
Benjamin Purvis lives with his mother Judith, who designs tacky clothes and makes rock-hard popcorn balls. Judith and Benjamin make ends meet by working at a women's retail clothing store. Benjamin spends his spare time writing science fiction stories, and he has recently completed a story called Yeast Lords, which centers on a hero named Bronco, modeled after his long-dead father.

At various times, portions of Yeast Lords are seen as Benjamin imagines them. Bronco is obliquely masculine, and he valiantly struggles with a villain over yeast production.

At a two-day writing camp for aspiring fantasy and science fiction authors, Benjamin attends lectures by his idol, the prolific and pretentious writer Ronald Chevalier. Chevalier announces a contest for the writers, in which the winner's story will be published nationally. After encouragement from fellow camper Tabatha, Benjamin submits Yeast Lords. Tabatha shows the story to her friend Lonnie Donaho who runs an ultra low-budget video production company. Lonnie gives Benjamin a post-dated check for $500 and begins adapting Yeast Lords into a film.

As Chevalier reviews the stories from the campers, he gets a call from his publisher, rejecting his latest manuscript. Panicked, he picks up Benjamin's story, and it sparks his imagination. Chevalier changes Purvis' Bronco into Brutus, an extremely effeminate and comically flamboyant hero, changes the other character names and title, but otherwise leaves the story intact. His publisher loves it, and the novel is rushed into production under the title Brutus and Balzaak.

Portions of Chevalier's version are now seen playing out alongside Benjamin's original vision of the story.

At the local premiere of Donaho's version of Yeast Lords, Benjamin is nauseated to see how badly Donaho has adapted his work, and he abruptly leaves the film with Tabatha. They go to a bookstore where he discovers Chevalier's plagiarism after reading a paragraph from Brutus and Balzaak. He confronts Chevalier at a local book signing, and assaults him with some merchandise Chevalier had offered him in exchange for keeping his theft quiet. Two policeman hustle him out of the store and he is placed in jail.

Judith comes to visit her son in jail to give him his birthday present. She hands him a box of manuscripts, all officially bound by the Writers Guild of America. She explains that she has been registering all his stories with them since he was seven years old, thinking they would make a nice keepsake for his children. Yeast Lords is one of the registered stories.

Copies of Chevalier's novel are unceremoniously dumped from store shelves and replaced with Benjamin's original novel.

Cast
 Michael Angarano as Benjamin Purvis
 Jemaine Clement as Dr. Ronald Chevalier
 Jennifer Coolidge as Judith Purvis
 Halley Feiffer as Tabatha Jenkins
 Héctor Jiménez as Lonnie Donaho
 Josh Pais as Todd Keefe
 Mike White as Dusty
 Sam Rockwell as Bronco/Brutus
 Suzanne May as Vanaya/Venonka
 Edgar Oliver as Duncan/Lord Daysius
 Clive Revill as Cletus

Production
In December 2007, JoBlo.com reported that Jared and Jerusha Hess had signed with Fox Searchlight Pictures to produce Gentlemen Broncos, based on a spec script they had written. The deal called for Jared Hess to direct and Mike White, who co-wrote Nacho Libre with them, to produce. Hess brought Angarano onto the project based on his performance in the film Snow Angels, which also starred Rockwell. Filming began in March 2008 in Utah. Much of the film was shot in Tooele, Utah.

In early August 2008, work on an Internet viral marketing began, which had a video introducing the character of Ronald Chevalier. A second video was released in October 2008. A trailer was released on August 19, 2009. Some of the artwork in the opening credits is by fantasy and science fiction artist David Lee Anderson.

Release
Gentlemen Broncos was intended to be released theatrically on October 30, 2009, but due to poor reviews the national release was pulled from theaters.

Reception

The film received mostly negative reviews and holds a 19% rating on Rotten Tomatoes based on 79 reviews by critics and the sites consensus reads: "Unselfconsciously juvenile and overwhelmingly quirky, Gentlemen Broncos offers a lot of potty humor but isn't terribly funny". Metacritic gave it a generally unfavorable 28 out of 100 based on 21 reviews. Roger Ebert gave the film 2 out of 4 stars, writing that while "Hess invents good characters" they quickly become lost in a disjointed and meandering story.  However, Richard Brody, writing for The New Yorker, lauded the film, and in 2018 described Gentlemen Broncos as "a truly great film, with no asterisk whatsoever".

Home media

Gentlemen Broncos was released on DVD and Blu-ray on March 2, 2010.

Soundtrack
 "In the Year 2525"
 Written by Rick Evans
 Performed by Zager & Evans
 "Act Naturally"
 Written by Voni Morrison and Johnny Russell
 Performed by Buck Owens
 "Cedar Dreams", "Twilight", "First Flight", "Winds of Stillness"
 Written and performed by John Two-Hawks
 "What a Town"
 Written by Bobby Charles and Richard Claire Danko
 Performed by David Bromberg
 "John Sebastions's Girl"
 Written and performed by Shara Joyce and Rory O'Donoghue
 "The Oh of Pleasure"
 Written and performed by Ray Lynch and Tom Canning
 "Beautiful Girl"
 Written by Patrick Shart and Mark Stevens
 "Wind of Change"
 Written by Klaus Meine
 Performed by Scorpions
 "The New World Anthem"
 Written and performed by Jeremy Wall
 "Celtic Voyage"
 Written by Joel Bevan
 "Moment of Truth"
 Written by Dan Graham
 "Celestial Soda Pop", "Tiny Geometries"
 Written and performed by Ray Lynch
 "Just Like Jesse James"
 Written by Diane Warren and Desmond Child
 Performed by Cher
 "Don Carlos"
 Written and performed by Robert Miller
 "Carry on Wayward Son"
 Written by Kerry Livgren
 Performed by Kansas
 "Paranoid"
 Written by John Osbourne, Tony Iommi, Terence Butler and William Ward
 Performed by Black Sabbath
 "Dust in the Wind"
 Written by Kerry Livgren
 Performed by Kansas

References

External links
 
 
 
 
 

2009 films
2000s coming-of-age comedy films
2009 independent films
2000s teen comedy films
American coming-of-age comedy films
American independent films
American teen comedy films
Fox Searchlight Pictures films
Films about writers
Films directed by Jared Hess
Films shot in Utah
2009 comedy films
2000s English-language films
2000s American films